Clevedon railway station served the town of Clevedon, North Somerset, England, from 1897 to 1940 on the Weston, Clevedon and Portishead Railway.

History 
The station was opened on 1 December 1897 by the Weston, Clevedon and Portishead Railway. It was originally a terminus until 1907, when Portishead opened to the north, as well as the stations in between. The platform was later rebuilt higher than the original one and a waiting shelter was built on it. It also had an engine shed and goods sidings, one serving a gas works. The station closed on 20 May 1940.

References 

Disused railway stations in Somerset
Railway stations in Great Britain opened in 1897
Railway stations in Great Britain closed in 1940
1897 establishments in England
1940 disestablishments in England